The Apulian regional election of 2015 were held on 31 May 2015.

The centre-left candidate Michele Emiliano won the election with a large margin from the Five Star Movement's candidate, Antonella Laricchia. The centre-right coalition broke up, presenting two different candidates, Francesco Schittulli, supported by former governor Raffaele Fitto, and Adriana Poli Bortone, supported by Silvio Berlusconi's Forza Italia, who arrived third and fourth.

Results

See also
2015 Italian regional elections

References

2015 elections in Italy
2015 regional election
2015
May 2015 events in Italy